Sofular can refer to:

 Sofular, Çameli
 Sofular, İvrindi, Turkey
 Sofular, Tavas
 Sofular, Tovuz, Azerbaijan
 Sofular, Yenice, Turkey